Milltown GAA may refer to:

Milltown GAA (Galway), a sports club in Ireland
Milltown GAA (Kildare), a sports club in Ireland

See also
Milltown Malbay GAA, a sports club in County Clare, Ireland